This is a list of sportsmen who have played both first-class cricket and professional football in Scotland or England. The list includes four sportsmen who are dual internationals, having represented Scotland's national team at both sports.

List of Scottish cricket and football players

Dual internationals

Scotland cricket team / Professional football

See also
List of English cricket and football players

References

Scottish
Football players
Cricket and football players
Cricket and football players
Association football player non-biographical articles